Monroe is a subway station on the Chicago Transit Authority's 'L' system, serving the Blue Line. It is located in the Chicago Loop, Chicago's downtown district.

History

Although the work on the station under Dearborn Street began in March 1939, the construction of the Milwaukee-Dearborn Subway and the station was suspended in 1941 because of wartime material shortages. Therefore, commuters had to wait ten years for the station to open. Monroe opened on February 25, 1951, fourteen years after being ordered by the Chicago Rapid Transit Company in 1937.

In 1969, the stairs to the northwest corner of Dearborn Street and Monroe Street were closed to allow the construction of the First National Bank Building and Plaza (renamed the Chase Tower) after the completion of a new entry was added in the lower level of the tower to the station. Monroe station was completely refurbished in 1982, but was not designed to be accessible to the handicapped.

This is the central of the three stations on one long continuous platform underneath Dearborn Street, with the stops at Washington and Jackson being the other two.

Bus connections
CTA
  22 Clark (Owl Service) 
  24 Wentworth (Weekdays only) 
  36 Broadway 
  62 Archer (Owl Service) 
  126 Jackson 
  151 Sheridan

Notes and references

Notes

References

External links
Monroe/Dearborn Station Page
Adams Street/Monroe Street entrance from Google Maps Street View
Madison Street/Monroe Street entrance from Google Maps Street View

CTA Blue Line stations
Railway stations in the United States opened in 1951